Klas Robert Schultzberg is a Swedish musician. He is best known as the original drummer for the English alternative rock band Placebo. Schultzberg had known Stefan Olsdal from a school band in Sweden in 1993 and joined Placebo when the band formed in September 1994. He played on their first studio demo in April 1995, which garnered much industry attention culminating in a deal with Virgin Records.

During Schultzberg's time in the band, several early works were recorded including their first 7" single "Bruise Pristine", the "Come Home" EP, the single version of "Nancy Boy" with b-sides "Slackerbitch", "Miss Moneypenny", "Bigmouth Strikes Again" and their eponymous debut album; on the track "I Know", he played didgeridoo as well as drums. He left the band in October 1996 after a strained relationship with Brian Molko.

References

1975 births
Living people
Swedish drummers
Male drummers
Placebo (band) members
21st-century drummers
21st-century Swedish male musicians